Cylindrovertilla kingi, common name King's amber pupasnail, is a species of minute, air-breathing land snail, terrestrial pulmonate gastropod molluscs or micromolluscs in the family Vertiginidae, the whorl snails.

Distribution
This terrestrial species is endemic to Australia.and occurs in New South Wales and Queensland

References

 Cox, J.C. 1864. Catalogue of Australian Land Shells. Sydney : John Alex Engel 44 pp.
 Iredale, T. 1940. Guide to the land shells of New South Wales. Australian Naturalist 10: 227-236
 Solem, A. 1991. Distribution and diversity patterns of Australian pupilloid land snails (Mollusca: Pulmonata: Pupillidae, s.l.). Veliger 34(3): 233-252
 Stanisic, J., Shea, M., Potter, D. & Griffiths, O. 2010. Australian Land Snails. A field guide to eastern Australian species. Mauritius : Bioculture Press Vol. 1 595 pp.

External links
 Image at Australian Faunal Directory: Cylindrovertilla kingi 

Vertiginidae
Gastropods described in 1864
Taxonomy articles created by Polbot
Taxa named by James Charles Cox